Gjorče Petrov is one of the ten municipalities that compose the city of Skopje, the capital of North Macedonia. It is named after the revolutionary Gjorče Petrov.

Geography
Gjorče Petrov borders
Saraj to the southwest,
Karpoš to the southeast,
Čučer-Sandevo to the east, and
Kosovo to the north.

The municipality is the place of the confluence of the Treska and Vardar rivers.

Demographics
According to the last national census from 2002, the municipality has 41,634 inhabitants.

Ethnic groups in the municipality include:
Macedonians = 35,455 (85.2%)
Serbs = 1,730 (4.2%)
Albanians = 1,597 (3.8%)
Roma = 1,249 (3.0%)
Bosniaks = 489 (1.2%)
others.

Sports
Football club FK Makedonija Gjorče Petrov has played in the top tier of Macedonian football for several years. Their home stadium is the Gjorče Petrov Stadium.

References

External links

Official website

 
Municipalities of North Macedonia
Municipalities of Skopje